Four to Dinner is a 2022 Italian film directed by Alessio Maria Federici, written by Martino Coli and starring Matilde Gioli, Giuseppe Maggio, Ilenia Pastorelli, and Matteo Martari.

Cast 
 Matilde Gioli	
 Giuseppe Maggio
 Matteo Martari
 Tommaso Basili as Alberto
 Ilenia Pastorelli
 Soraia Tavares
 Elmano Sancho
 Mauro Hermínio
 Luís Filipe Eusébio
 Cristiano Piacenti

References

External links
 
 

2022 films
Italian romantic comedy films
2020s Italian-language films
Italian-language Netflix original films